Madcon is a Norwegian musical duo formed in 1992 by Yosef Wolde-Mariam and Tshawe Baqwa. They have released eight albums as of 2022. They are best known for the 2007 cover of "Beggin'" by The Four Seasons.

Members

Yosef Wolde-Mariam
Yosef Wolde-Mariam (born 4th August, 1978) is an Ethiopian-Norwegian TV presenter and rapper. His parents originated from Ethiopia and Eritrea.

Wolde-Mariam grew up in Grefsen Norway, and moved with his mother between Røyken, Grønland,  Grünerløkka and Bekkelaget. In 2012, he was a mentor on the Norwegian version of The Voice known as The Voice – Norges beste stemme, broadcast on the Norwegian television station TV 2.

Tshawe Baqwa
Tshawe Baqwa (born 6th January, 1980 in Saarbrücken, Germany) is a South African-German-Norwegian rapper and TV presenter.'Baqwa moved to South Africa with his parents when he was 14 years old in the wake of the country's first democratic general election, eventually returning to Norway for a musical career.

Baqwa took part and won the third season of the Norwegian dance competition Skal vi danse? (lit. "Shall we dance?"). Although the judges ultimately favored finalist Mona Grudt, Baqwa won by public vote. He also performed as a voice over artist in the film Rio, playing the character of Nico.

History
Madcon released their first single, "God Forgive Me" in 2000 (Virgin Records), but their first commercial breakthrough came with the hit single "Barcelona" in 2002 with long-time collaborators Paperboys (on the Bonnier Amigo record label). In 2004, Madcon released their first official album It's All a Madcon (AA-Recordings/Bonnier Amigo), for which they won a Norwegian Grammy and several other awards. In 2005, Madcon were TV personalities on the Nordic music channel The Voice, while working on their music in the studio. The show "The Voice of Madcon", a behind-the-scenes of the duo, was a great success for both Madcon and the network.

In autumn 2007, Baqwa was invited to take part in the popular reality television program Skal vi danse?, the Norwegian version of Strictly Come Dancing eventually winning that year's series.

Their second album, So Dark The Con Of Man, was released on 3 December 2007. In the United Kingdom, the album reached number 137 on the album charts. In Norway, the album was certified gold in 3 hours and platinum in 3 days. The album featured the soul singer Noora Noor and Paperboys on two of the songs.

In 2008, Madcon released a cover version of a 1967 The Four Seasons' song "Beggin'", earning the group several #1 chart positions in France, Portugal, Norway and Russia, and a global position # 2 on the European Billboard Hot 100 chart. In addition, they achieved 9 x platinum in Norway, and were No. 1 on the official Norwegian sales charts for 12 weeks, making "Beggin" one of the biggest hits of all time in Norway. Madcon’s cover of "Beggin" was created by 3Elementz (now ELEMENT), who also produced the other singles “So Dark The Con Of Man", and all tracks of the Inconvenient Truth album. They led the World Music Awards on 10 November 2008 and won the World's Best Selling Norwegian Artist Award. "Beggin'" reached Gold sales in the United States.

After several negotiations, Madcon's label (Bonnier Amigo) signed a licensing agreement with Sony BMG for Central Europe, Great Britain, Australia and New Zealand, Universal Republic in the U.S., Warner Music in Spain, and Just Music in South Africa. Madcon have also hosted the Norwegian version of Don't Forget the Lyrics!, Kan du Teksten? on TV 2 (Norway).

Their third album, Inconvenient Truth was released all over Europe in early to mid-2009, and the group saw other major releases, including in the USA, Japan and Australia.

Madcon performed their song "Glow", as the background of the "Eurovision 2010 Flashmob dance" that was broadcast in the Eurovision Song Contest 2010 interval act. The song became another one of the biggest hits of all times in Norway, reaching more than 10 times platinum status in Norway and platinum in Germany. The song was produced by Element.

In 2011, during the gala awards ESKA Music Awards 2011 in Poland, Madcon was awarded the International Band of the Year.

Madcon reached platinum status with the hit single "Freaky Like Me", featuring Ameerah and produced by the Norwegian hit producer DreamRoc'a, also known as Sha Arjang Shishegar and TJ Oosterhuis. "Freaky Like Me' is the group's third biggest international hit.

Television
In 2021, Madcon appeared on the Norwegian television series Exit during the 6th episode of the first season, portraying a musical duo invited to play in an open-air party. They are heard performing, among other songs, their cover of "Beggin'."

Musical style and performance

Madcon describe their musical style as a retro-urban mix with influences from funk, soul and hip hop, with additional elements from reggae, Latin and African musical influences.

Madcon's cover of the song "Beggin'" was used in the movies Step Up 3, Street Dance 3D, Just Go With It, and the theatrical trailer for Bad Teacher. It was sung by Philip Phillips on American Idol in 2012, and by Bill Downs and Max Milner in the battle rounds of The Voice UK series 1.

Discography

 It's All a Madcon (2004)
 So Dark the Con of Man (2007)
 An InCONvenient Truth (2008)
 Contraband (2010)
 Contakt (2012)
 Icon (2013)
 Contakt Vol. 2'' (2018)

References

External links

 Official site
 Discogs page
 Daily Music Guide "Beggin'" review
 Liar (single) review
 Glow (Their single performed during the 2010 Eurovision Song Contest) 

Norwegian hip hop groups
Norwegian synthpop groups
Norwegian electronic music groups
Norwegian dance music groups
Norwegian pop music groups
World Music Awards winners
Spellemannprisen winners
Bonnier Amigo Music Group artists
Musical groups established in 1992
1992 establishments in Norway
Musical groups from Oslo
Hip hop duos
Norwegian musical duos